"Conticinio" is a well-known Venezuelan song, that was composed in 1922 by Laudelino Mejías, like anecdotal data, Mejías explained that his composition was made when he remembered Trujillo city in Venezuela.

See also 
Venezuela
Venezuelan music
Laudelino Mejías
Ilan Chester

External links 
Venciclopedia: Letra e historia de Conticinio.

Spanish-language songs
Venezuelan songs